The BDO Gold Cup began in 1978 and was held in Stoke. It was broadcast on the BBC until 1982, with the 1983 tournament blacked out due to a technicians' strike.  ITV took over from 1984-1988, and BSB/BSkyB's The Sports Channel/Sky Sports covered the event from 1990-92. It was then broadcast in 2008 on Setanta Sports in the UK, after a brief stint on the short-lived channel Wire TV (1994-95). At the end of its existence, the event was staged at the Magna Centre, Rotherham, England.

List of winners

Men's

Women's

References

External links
BDO Official website

1978 establishments in the United Kingdom
2019 disestablishments in the United Kingdom
British Darts Organisation tournaments
Darts tournaments